The Thirty-Eighth Wisconsin Legislature convened from  to  in regular session.

Senators representing odd-numbered districts were newly elected for this session and were serving the first two years of a four-year term. Assembly members were elected to a two-year term. Assembly members and odd-numbered senators were elected in the general election of November 2, 1886. Senators representing even-numbered districts were serving the third and fourth year of a four-year term, having been elected in the general election of November 4, 1884.

Major events
 January 26, 1887: Philetus Sawyer was re-elected as United States Senator by the Wisconsin Legislature in joint session.
 February 4, 1887: U.S. President Grover Cleveland signed the Interstate Commerce Act of 1887, which was designed to regulate the railroad monopolies.
 February 8, 1887: U.S. President Grover Cleveland signed the Dawes Act, which allowed the federal government to designate private ownership within Native American tribal land.
 April 4, 1887: Susanna M. Salter was elected mayor of Argonia, Kansas, the first female mayor in the United States.
 July 6, 1887: King Kalākaua of Hawaii was forced to sign the 1887 Constitution of the Hawaiian Kingdom, which stripped the monarchy of much of its power and disenfranchised native Hawaiians, Asians, and the poor.
 November 13, 1887: Police in London clashed with Irish nationalist protesters in an incident known as Bloody Sunday.
 January 16, 1888: Wisconsinite William Freeman Vilas became United States Secretary of the Interior.
 March 25, 1888: Opening day of an international Congress for Women's Rights organized by Susan B. Anthony in Washington, D.C.  The congress led to formation of the International Council of Women.
 June 15, 1888: German Emperor Frederick III died of cancer after a brief reign.  He was succeeded by his son, Wilhelm II.
 November 6, 1888: 1888 United States general election: 
 Benjamin Harrison elected President of the United States, despite losing the popular vote.
 William D. Hoard elected Governor of Wisconsin.
 The referendum on a proposed amendment to the Wisconsin Constitution, relating to education, was defeated.

Major legislation
 April 12, 1887: An Act to apportion the state into senate and assembly districts, 1887 Act 461.
 Joint Resolution agreeing to a proposed amendment to section 1, of article 10, of the constitution of the state of Wisconsin, relating to education, 1887 Joint Resolution 4. This was the required second legislative passage of the proposed amendment to the state constitution to update language relating to state education officers.  The amendment was put to a referendum in the November 1888 general election, but was defeated by voters.
 Joint Resolution proposing an amendment to the constitution, 1887 Joint Resolution 5.  Proposed a new amendment to the Wisconsin Constitution to abolish the separate offices of "chief justice" and "associate justices" of the Wisconsin Supreme Court and instead define all members of the court as "justices" with the most senior justice acting as "chief justice".

Party summary

Senate summary

Assembly summary

Sessions
 1st Regular session: January 12, 1887April 15, 1887

Leaders

Senate leadership
 President of the Senate: George W. Ryland (R)
 President pro tempore: Charles K. Erwin (R)

Assembly leadership
 Speaker of the Assembly: Thomas B. Mills (R)

Members

Members of the Senate
Members of the Senate for the Thirty-Eighth Wisconsin Legislature:

Members of the Assembly
Members of the Assembly for the Thirty-Eighth Wisconsin Legislature:

Committees

Senate committees
 Senate Committee on Agriculture
 Senate Committee on Assessment and Collection of Taxes
 Senate Committee on Education
 Senate Committee on Enrolled Bills
 Senate Committee on Engrossed Bills
 Senate Committee on Federal Relations
 Senate Committee on Finance, Banks, and Insurance
 Senate Committee on Incorporations
 Senate Committee on the Judiciary
 Senate Committee on Legislative Expenditures
 Senate Committee on Manufacturing and Commerce
 Senate Committee on Military Affairs
 Senate Committee on Privileges and Elections
 Senate Committee on Public Lands
 Senate Committee on Railroads
 Senate Committee on Roads and Bridges
 Senate Committee on State Affairs
 Senate Committee on Town and County Organizations

Assembly committees
 Assembly Committee on AgricultureG. G. Cox, chair
 Assembly Committee on Assessment and Collection of TaxesG. A. Dreutzer, chair
 Assembly Committee on Bills on their Third ReadingFrank Challoner, chair
 Assembly Committee on CitiesJ. R. Brigham, chair
 Assembly Committee on EducationJ. C. Bartholf, chair
 Assembly Committee on Engrossed BillsC. E. Hooker, chair
 Assembly Committee on Enrolled BillsGeorge Spratt, chair
 Assembly Committee on Federal RelationsHugh Porter, chair
 Assembly Committee on IncorporationsCharles M. Hall, chair
 Assembly Committee on Insurance, Banks, and BankingG. A. Knapp, chair
 Assembly Committee on the JudiciaryH. L. Humphrey, chair
 Assembly Committee on Legislative ExpendituresSam S. Miller, chair
 Assembly Committee on Labor and ManufacturesFrank Avery, chair
 Assembly Committee on Lumber and MiningA. S. McDonald, chair
 Assembly Committee on Medical SocietiesH. Powell, chair
 Assembly Committee on MilitiaJ. B. McCoy, chair
 Assembly Committee on Privileges and ElectionsW. B. La Selle, chair
 Assembly Committee on Public ImprovementsSamuel Sloggy, chair
 Assembly Committee on RailroadsJ. C. Reynolds, chair
 Assembly Committee on Roads and BridgesR. M. Day, chair
 Assembly Committee on State LandsC. F. Mohr, chair
 Assembly Committee on State AffairsW. J. McElroy, chair
 Assembly Committee on Town and County OrganizationH. C. Hetzel, chair
 Assembly Committee on Ways and MeansR. W. Jackson, chair

Joint committees
 Joint Committee on Charitable and Penal Institutions
 Joint Committee on Claims
 Joint Committee on Printing
 Joint Committee on Apportionment of the State

Employees

Senate employees
 Chief Clerk: Charles E. Bross
 Assistant Clerk: J. O. Warriner
 Bookkeeper: Oliver Munson
 Engrossing Clerk: L. W. Jacobs
 Enrolling Clerk: E. R. Smith
 Transcribing Clerk: C. E. Webster
 Proofreader: M. A. Hoyt
 Index Clerk: H. S. Ball
 Clerk for the Judiciary Committee: Thomas Norton
 Clerk for the Committee on Incorporations: W. E. Webster
 Clerk for the Committee on Claims: George B. Blair
 Document Clerk: M. M. Conant
 Sergeant-at-Arms: T. J. George
 Assistant Sergeant-at-Arms: W. W. Baker
 Postmaster: H. Stone Richardson
 Assistant Postmaster: John R. Smyth
 Gallery Attendant: Mark W. Baker
 Document Room Attendant: Samuel Chase
 Committee Room Attendants:
 H. L. Westenhaven
 J. H. Holcomb
 Doorkeepers:
 S. N. Knudson
 Nelson Darling
 John Dishmaker
 H. C. Fulton
 Porter: John Malone
 Night Watch: Marcus H. Barnum
 Janitor: F. D. Johnson
 Messengers:
 Prentice Flint
 Dexter Baker
 Julius Seresse
 Harvey Hulburt
 Joseph Rupp
 Ernest Micklist
 Louis Hammond
 Frank Bancroft

Assembly employees
 Chief Clerk: Edwin Coe
 1st Assistant Clerk: C. A. Coon
 2nd Assistant Clerk: Walter L. Houser
 Bookkeeper: J. T. Huntington
 Engrossing Clerk: Egbert Wyman
 Assistant Engrossing Clerk: Archie McMillan
 Enrolling Clerk: L. J. Burlingame
 Assistant Enrolling Clerk: Jos. Albrecht
 Transcribing Clerk: George W. Currier
 Assistant Transcribing Clerk: W. J. Egbert
 Index Clerk: George P. Smith
 Comparing Clerk: E. A. Charlton
 Clerk for the Judiciary Committee: S. J. Morse
 Clerk for the Committee on Enrolled Bills: G. S. Putnam
 Clerk for the Committee on Engrossed Bills: J. M. Hayden
 Clerk for the Committee on State Affairs: Robert W. Chapin
 Clerk for the Committee on Third Reading: C. J. Hicks
 Document Clerk: E. A. Hanks
 Custodian of the Engrossing and Enrolling Rooms: J. J. Marshall
 Sergeant-at-Arms: William A. Adamson
 Assistant Sergeant-at-Arms: M. C. Matson
 Postmaster: C. W. McMillan
 Assistant Postmaster: G. R. Hall
 Doorkeepers:
 James Sharp
 John H. Vivian
 G. W. Dart
 D. F. Cleaveland
 Gallery Attendants:
 Ira S. Vaughn
 H. H. Lampman
 Committee Room Attendants: 
 V. A. Henwood
 George Campbell
 Document Room Attendant: C. Schneider
 Porter: A. B. Lynn
 Policeman: R. M. Burke
 Flagman: N. P. Nelson
 Night Watch: George Hanover
 Wash Room Attendant: Lucian H. Palmer
 Messengers:
 Lewis Olson
 Willie Gillet
 M. E. Lynch
 Gifford Best
 Fred Willett
 Anton Peterson
 Christ Doehring
 Ralph Norriss
 Willie Shaver
 James Whitty
 Willie Berg
 Willie Hughes

References

External links
 1887: Related Documents from Wisconsin Legislature

1887 in Wisconsin
Wisconsin
Wisconsin legislative sessions